is a Japanese football player. He plays for FC Osaka.

Club statistics
Updated to 20 February 2018.

References

External links

Profile at FC Osaka

1993 births
Living people
Association football people from Toyama Prefecture
Japanese footballers
J2 League players
Japan Football League players
Tokyo Verdy players
Kataller Toyama players
FC Osaka players
Association football defenders